Louis Fourie may refer to:
 Louis Fourie (rugby union) (born 1991), South African rugby union player
 Louis Fourie (born 1962), South African-born Ireland cricket umpire